Jon Ander Felipe González (born 22 May 1995), known simply as Jon Ander, is a Spanish professional footballer who plays as a goalkeeper for CD Tudelano.

Career
Born in Getxo, Biscay, Jon Ander gonzalez feka began his career in the youth ranks of Athletic Bilbao. He was first included in a matchday squad for the reserve team on 16 November 2013, remaining an unused substitute in a 2–0 Segunda División B home win over Barakaldo CF, and had two further call-ups over the season.

In August 2014, he was loaned to a team in the same group of the division, SD Amorebieta, where he made his senior debut on the 24th in a 4–0 loss away to his parent club; he remained on the bench for the remainder of his loan. On 8 March 2015, he made his Bilbao Athletic debut, in a 1–0 loss away to CD Tudelano, and made three more appearances in a season which ended in promotion to Segunda División.

On 10 October 2015, Jon Ander made his first appearance in a professional league, keeping goal for Bilbao Athletic in a goalless draw against CD Numancia at the San Mamés Stadium, in which he saved a penalty kick from Óscar Díaz. On 7 June 2016, after suffering relegation, he was released by the Lions.

On 13 July 2016 Jon Ander signed for SD Eibar, being immediately loaned to UD Logroñés for one year. After only three appearances for the Riojans, he joined fellow third division side UE Llagostera on the same basis the following 1 February, and was again unused.

Jon Ander left for CD Toledo in July 2017, and played seven total games as back-up for Pablo Alcolea as the Manchegans were relegated. He remained without a team before returning to Amorebieta in January 2019.

On 2 January 2020, Ander joined SD Ejea on a deal for the rest of the season.

References

External links

1995 births
Living people
Footballers from Getxo
Spanish footballers
Association football goalkeepers
Segunda División players
Segunda División B players
CD Basconia footballers
Bilbao Athletic footballers
SD Amorebieta footballers
SD Eibar footballers
UD Logroñés players
UE Costa Brava players
CD Toledo players
SD Ejea players
CD Tudelano footballers
Athletic Bilbao footballers